Hans Dominik may refer to:

 Hans Dominik (Schutztruppe) (1870–1910), German colonial officer of the Schutztruppe
 Hans Dominik (writer) (1872–1945), German science fiction and non-fiction author
 Hans Dominik (Kriegsmarine) (1906–1980), Kapitän zur See in the Kriegsmarine